Tetrabaena is a genus of green algae in the family Tetrabaenaceae.

References

External links

Chlamydomonadales
Chlamydomonadales genera
Articles containing video clips